Universe: The History (stylized in all caps) is the second studio album and debut Japanese album release by South Korean boy group Pentagon. The album was released on September 23, 2020, containing Japanese songs from their debut mini album Gorilla and debut singles "Cosmo" and "Happiness / Sha La La". Member Jinho participated in the activities before enlisted for his mandatory military service on May 11, 2020.

Background and release
Starting July 20, 2020, Pentagon individual images with the phrase "PENTAGON 2020.07.28 TUE 5PM" were posted on their official Japan Twitter account. However, the purpose of the teaser image was not clarified. On July 28, it was confirmed that the group will release their first full-length Japanese album Universe: The History.

On August 4, Pentagon released jacket photos of their first studio album Universe: The History through their website. It was released in three versions: a limited edition A with a DVD containing a 60-minute movie "Spring Story", a limited edition B with a 100-page photo book, and a regular edition with a CD only. In addition, the 8 solo version of each member will be released in a total of 11 formats.

On September 9, Pentagon unveiled the song "Dr. Bebe (Japanese Ver.)" on Teru's radio program TERU ME NIGHT GLAY. The song was officially released through various streaming platforms on September 14. Accompanying the album release was a live performance video of "Dr. Bebe (Japanese Ver.)".

Track listing

Commercial performance
Universe: The History was ranked 2nd on the Oricon Daily Album Chart and 3rd on the iTunes K-Pop Album Chart on the day of its release.

Charts

Certifications and sales

|}

Release history

References 

2020 albums
Cube Entertainment albums
Japanese-language albums
Pentagon (South Korean band) albums
Universal Music Japan albums
Albums produced by Hui (singer)
Albums produced by Kino (singer)